Israeli composer Paul Ben-Haim's Symphony no. 1 is the first Eretz-Israel symphony and one of the most important works in the history of classical music in Israel.

Background 

Ben-Haim started composing the piece at the end of August 1939 and completed it at the end of June 1940. This is the period after his immigration to Israel, and the end of the days of the fall of France. The composition of the piece is about "the desire to compose a large-scale composition in the spirit of our people and country for our Eretz Israel Orchestra... the terrible rampage of the underworld forces must have had a powerful impact on my composition (at least on its first movement, and to some extent also on its last). Nevertheless, this composition is nothing but absolute pure music..."

Structure 

The piece has three movements:

 Allegro energico—according to Yehoash Hirschberg, the first theme, which is characterized by rhetorical expression of excitement and storm in the exposition, changes its nature into pastoral lyricism. The second theme, which is festive and wondering in exposition, becomes a military march. The movement is organized into long divisions, each of which features a climax, and decays slowly. The descending augmented second motive functions as an expression of lament and the pain of the Jewish prayer.
 Molto calmo e cantabile—is based on a long melodic line presenting the movement's motif material. The final part of the theme is a quote from a traditional song motif of Persian Jews I shall lift my eyes to the mountains, arranged by Ben-Haim for Bracha Tzfira in the beginning of April 1940.
 Presto con fuoco—above a constant tarantella rhythm are two contrasting ideas: a quote from the choir part of the first finale of Ben-Haim's great work Yoram, followed by a syncopated hora dance.

References 

Compositions by Paul Ben-Haim
Classical music in Israel
1940 compositions
Ben-Haim 1